Guzmán Quintero Torres was a Colombian journalist and reporter from the city of Valledupar. He was assassinated on September 16, 1999 after writing a series of articles two months before his death in which he denounced the involvement of some members of the Colombian National Army in the erroneous assassination of two women (one of them pregnant) and wounding some eight children after confusing them with guerrillas in the corregimientos of Patillal and Río Seco.

By the time Quintero Torres was assassinated paramilitary groups, mainly the AUC were in the middle of a fight for territorial power and control against the guerrillas FARC and ELN. Both sides persecuted civilians who they thought supported the other group. Paramilitaries targeted any guerrilla supporters and aiders, human right NGO's that expressed any criticism, sometimes done along with active members of the Colombian National Army, ties that Quintero had also denounced in his articles. Quintero constantly denounced parapolitics involvements against union leaders, peasants, politicians and think tanks since the assassination of peace advocate Amparo Leonor Jiménez who worked for an NGO called red de Iniciativas por la paz (Network of Initiatives for Peace) (REDEPAZ).

See also
Colombian armed conflict (1960s–present)

References

People from Valledupar
Colombian journalists
Male journalists
1999 deaths
20th-century births
Assassinated Colombian people
20th-century journalists